Jyotikuchi is a locality in Guwahati. It is surrounded by the localities of Lokhra, Sawkuchi and Barsapara.

See also
 Gyan Educational Institution
 Lalganesh
 Chandmari
 Bhetapara
 Guwahati

References

Neighbourhoods in Guwahati